Danyan may refer to:
 Bahnea, Romania
 Danian, Iran (disambiguation)